Mount Pleasant of Edinboro is a small ski resort nestled in the "ski country" snowbelt region of northwestern Pennsylvania, USA, near Edinboro, in Erie County.  It offers an array of challenging terrain and conditions.

References
Official Web site

Ski areas and resorts in Pennsylvania
Buildings and structures in Erie County, Pennsylvania
Tourist attractions in Erie County, Pennsylvania